Charles Calvin Ziegler (1854–1930) was a German-American poet from Rebersburg, Pennsylvania. His native language was Pennsylvania Dutch, and although he learned English in school, he wrote his poetry in the Pennsylvania Dutch language. He is said to have been the most accomplished poet to write in that language, and may have written the only Pennsylvania Dutch sonnet on record.

Background
Ziegler was born on a farm to a 39-year-old mother and an even older father.  He had at least one older brother, Samuel, who moved to Iowa when Calvin was still young.  When he was sixteen, Calvin went to join Samuel, eventually graduating the University of Iowa in 1878.  He returned to Rebersburg and pursued teaching, but left again in October 1881 to study Greek and Latin at Harvard. In 1884 he graduated magna cum laude and returned briefly to Rebersburg. He left for good in 1885, settling in St. Louis.

Ziegler published a volume of poems with a Leipzig publisher in 1891, Drauss un Deheem, helping spur a revival of Pennsylvania Dutch literature.  Included in the volume in a set of nineteen poems devoted to his mother, who died weeks before his Harvard graduation.  The volume was republished in Pennsylvania 1936, with some additional material.

References

1854 births
1930 deaths
Poets from Pennsylvania
University of Iowa alumni
Harvard College alumni
People from Centre County, Pennsylvania
American people of German descent